

Bild may refer to:

People
Bild (surname), people with the surname

Media
Bild, German tabloid
Bild (TV channel), German TV channel 
Bild am Sonntag, German national Sunday newspaper 
Auto Bild, German automobile magazine
Computer Bild, German fortnightly computer magazine
Bild der Frau, German language weekly women's magazine
Hänt Bild, Swedish celebrity magazine
Sport Bild, German sports magazine

Others
"Das Bild" (Schubert), a song composed in 1815

See also
 Bildt (disambiguation)